Trevor Murray Reinders (born 10 October 1963) is a former Zimbabwean cricketer. A right-handed batsman and right-arm medium pace bowler, he played two first-class matches for Mashonaland Country Districts during the 1993–94 Logan Cup.

References

External links
 
 

1963 births
Living people
Cricketers from Harare
Mashonaland cricketers
Zimbabwean cricketers